Isthmura is a genus of salamanders in the family Plethodontidae. They are endemic to Mexico. The genus, which corresponds to the former "Pseudoeurycea bellii species group" and was first described as a subgenus of Pseudoeurycea, was raised to full generic level in 2015 in order to preserve Ixalotriton and Bolitoglossa while avoiding paraphyly of Pseudoeurycea.

Description
Isthmura are large to very large salamanders, and the largest plethodontid salamanders in the Neotropics. They have robust, black bodies that usually have bold red, orange, or pink markings. The toes have slight webbing. The fifth toe is well-developed. They inhabit montane forests mostly above , although Isthmura gigantea and Isthmura maxima have lower minimum altitude limits (respectively ).

Species
Isthmura contains the following species:

References

 
Amphibian genera
Amphibians of North America
Endemic amphibians of Mexico